Adria Mobil is a Continental cycling team founded in 1972 (as continental team from 2005). It is based in Novo Mesto, Slovenia and it participates in UCI Continental Circuits races.

Team is sponsored by producer of motorhomes and caravans Adria Mobil, which is also sponsoring GP Adria Mobil one day race and Tour of Slovenia.

History
The team Adria Mobil started back in 1972 where the team was initially called Cycling team Novo mesto. In 1997 the club created a second professional cycling team  this folded in 2011.

Team roster

Major wins 

2005
Stage 3 Istrian Spring Trophy, Janez Brajkovič
Stage 6 Thüringen Rundfahrt der U23, Miha Švab
2006
 Overall Tour of Slovenia, Tomaž Nose
Stage 2 & 3, Tomaž Nose
Poreč Trophy, Simon Špilak
2007
Poreč Trophy, Marko Kump
Gran Premio Palio del Recioto, Robert Kišerlovski
 Overall Tour of Slovenia, Tomaž Nose
Prologue Tour de Croatie, Jure Zrimšek
2008
GP Kranj, Grega Bole
2009
Stage 1 Istrian Spring Trophy, Marko Kump
Stage 4 Tour of Slovenia, Marko Kump
Slovenian National Road Race Championships, Blaž Jarc
Ljubljana–Zagreb, Robert Vrečer
Stage 7 Tour of Hainan, Grega Bole
2010
Trofeo Zsšdi, Marko Kump
Poreč Trophy, Matej Gnezda
Stage 4 Settimana Internazionale di Coppi e Bartali, Marko Kump
GP Kranj, Matej Gnezda
2011
Poreč Trophy, Blaž Jarc
Ljubljana–Zagreb, Kristjan Fajt
2012
Poreč Trophy, Matej Mugerli
Stage 1 Istrian Spring Trophy, Marko Kump
Banja Luka–Beograd I, Marko Kump
Banja Luka–Beograd II, Matej Mugerli
Stage 1 Szlakiem Grodów Piastowskich, Marko Kump
Stage 4 Szlakiem Grodów Piastowskich, Radoslav Rogina
Grand Prix Südkärnten, Marko Kump
Central European Tour Budapest GP, Marko Kump
Ljubljana–Zagreb, Marko Kump
Tour of Vojvodina I, Kristjan Fajt
2013
 Time Trial Championships, Klemen Štimulak
Trofej Umag, Aljaž Hočevar
Poreč Trophy, Matej Mugerli
 Overall Istrian Spring Trophy, Matej Mugerli
Stage 1, Matej Mugerli
GP Šenčur, Radoslav Rogina
Banja Luka–Beograd II, Matej Mugerli
Classic Beograd–Čačak, Matej Mugerli
 Overall Tour of Slovenia, Radoslav Rogina
Stage 3, Radoslav Rogina
2014
 Road Race Championships, Radoslav Rogina
 Time Trial Championships, Bruno Maltar
 Road Race Championships, Matej Mugerli
Trofej Umag, Matej Mugerli
Gran Premio Industrie del Marmo, Matej Mugerli
Stage 2 Tour d'Azerbaïdjan, Primož Roglič
GP Judendorf-Strassengel, Radoslav Rogina
Giro del Medio Brenta, Klemen Štimulak
 Overall Sibiu Cycling Tour, Radoslav Rogina
Stage 1, Radoslav Rogina
Croatia–Slovenia, Primož Roglič
2015
Trofej Umag, Marko Kump
Poreč Trophy, Marko Kump
Stage 3 Istrian Spring Trophy, Marko Kump
GP Adria Mobil, Marko Kump
Belgrade–Banja Luka I, Marko Kump
Stage 2 Tour of Croatia, Marko Kump
 Overall Tour d'Azerbaïdjan,  Primož Roglič
Stage 1, Marko Kump
Stage 2, Primož Roglič
Overall Tour of Małopolska, Marko Kump
Stages 1 & 2, Marko Kump
 Overall Tour of Slovenia, Primož Roglič
Stage 3, Primož Roglič
Stage 4, Marko Kump
 Overall Tour of Qinghai Lake, Radoslav Rogina
Stages 1, 2, 6, 9 & 12, Marko Kump
Stage 5, Primož Roglič
Croatia–Slovenia, Marko Kump
2016
GP Izola, Jure Golčer
Ronde van Vlaanderen U23, David Per
 Time Trial Championships, David Per
 Road Race Championships, Radoslav Rogina
2017
 Time Trial Championships, Dušan Rajović
Stage 2 Tour of Qinghai Lake, Dušan Rajović
Croatia–Slovenia, Dušan Rajović
2018
GP Izola, Dušan Rajović
Overall Belgrade–Banja Luka, Gašper Katrašnik
Stages 1 & 2, Gašper Katrašnik
Stage 4 Szlakiem Grodów Piastowskich, Gašper Katrašnik
 Time Trial Championships, Dušan Rajović
Stage 10 Tour of Qinghai Lake, Dušan Rajović
Croatia–Slovenia, Dušan Rajović
2019
GP Izola, Marko Kump
International Rhodes Grand Prix, Dušan Rajović
Stage 1 International Tour of Rhodes, Dušan Rajović
GP Adria Mobil, Marko Kump
Stage 4 Belgrade–Banja Luka, Marko Kump
Stage 1 Tour of Bihor, Marko Kump
Stage 2 (ITT) Tour of Bihor, Dušan Rajović
GP Kranj, Marko Kump
Croatia–Slovenia, Marko Kump
Stage 1 CRO Race, Marko Kump
Stage 4 CRO Race, Dušan Rajović
2021
 Croatia–Slovenia, Žiga Horvat
2022
  National Road Race Championships, Kristijan Koren

National champions
2013
 Slovenia Time Trial Klemen Štimulak
2014
 Croatia Road Race Radoslav Rogina
 Croatia Time Trial Bruno Maltar
 Slovenia Road Race Matej Mugerli
2016
 Slovenia Time Trial David Per
 Croatia Road Race Radoslav Rogina
2017
 Serbia Time Trial Dušan Rajović
2018
 Serbia Time Trial Dušan Rajović
2022 
 Slovenia Road Race Kristjan Koren

References

External links

UCI Continental Teams (Europe)
Cycling teams established in 2005
Cycling teams based in Slovenia
2005 establishments in Slovenia